"Yokel Chords" is the fourteenth episode of the eighteenth season of the American animated television series The Simpsons. It originally aired on the Fox network in the United States on March 4, 2007. It was written by Michael Price, and directed by Susie Dietter. Guest starring Meg Ryan as Dr. Swanson, Peter Bogdanovich as a psychiatrist and Andy Dick, James Patterson and Stephen Sondheim as themselves. This also marked the return of director Susie Dietter who had taken a hiatus to work on Futurama and the film Open Season. This was her first episode in nearly nine years.

It won the 2008 Annie Award for Music in an Animated Television Production.

Plot
Marge oversleeps, and this forces Homer to make the children's lunch for the day. He does not do a very good job, so Bart decides to scare an alternative lunch out of his friends by making up a story about a cannibal cafeteria worker named Dark Stanley, who killed all the students in the cafeteria and put them in his kids' head soup and was eventually hanged for his crimes. According to Bart, Dark Stanley's ghost haunts the site to repeat his act of murder on the current kids. At lunchtime, Bart pretends to be killed by Dark Stanley, leading all the students to run screaming into the woods while he takes their lunches. Groundskeeper Willie is sent to fetch the students back and brings seven extra kids: Cletus's children. Principal Skinner tells Superintendent Chalmers that the kids have been refused education in fear that they will lower test averages and cost the school federal funding, which Lisa overhears. To appease her, Skinner and Chalmers appoint her tutor of the children.

Her initial tutoring efforts are unsuccessful, so she decides to take the children to downtown Springfield to introduce them to culture in the outside world. However, her plans are diverted when Krusty spots the kids singing, decides to use them as a musical act for his show, and offers them a contract, which Cletus signs immediately. Lisa is worried about the way that Krusty and Cletus are exploiting the children, so she sends an e-mail to Brandine, who is currently a soldier in Iraq. She arrives by helicopter to tell Krusty that the contract Cletus signed is null and void, as he is the father of only two of the seven children. Cletus tells her that they owe Krusty $12,000, but she assures him that they can live on that, and Cletus is happy to have things back to normal.

Meanwhile, Skinner punishes Bart by having him spend five sessions with Dr. Stacey Swanson (Meg Ryan), a qualified psychiatrist. Bart is initially dismissive, but ends up developing a close bond with Swanson, who uses a Mad Libs-like game and violent video games to get him to open up about Homer's alcoholism and other matters. When his sessions end, Bart starts to miss the time he spent with her and enters into a state of depression.

A worried Marge uses the funds she had been saving up for Homer's breast reduction surgery to get her son one more session with Swanson. Bart then reveals that Homer and Marge were young and not ready for parenting when he was born, and that he acts out largely so they will focus on him instead of fighting with each other; he also adds he got the name "Dark Stanley" in part because Homer used to hit him with a Stanley-brand hammer. Happy that he got everything off his chest, Bart leaves therapy feeling good, and upon seeing that Swanson is visibly saddened when he leaves, assures her they will see each other again. Swanson goes to see her own psychiatrist (Peter Bogdanovich) where she says she cannot stop thinking about Bart. It is revealed during this discussion that Dark Stanley is in fact real, and had killed her own son: the therapist believes Swanson is projecting onto Bart, though Swanson claims she is not ready to go into that.

Cultural references 
 The musical number that plays during Bart's telling of 'Dark Stanley' is Suite Punta del Este, a song composed by Argentine composer Astor Piazzolla. The song is also featured in the movie 12 Monkeys.
 Lisa takes the Spuckler children to a cultural tour in downtown Springfield. The song that forms the backdrop soundtrack for the tour is "Cultural Things", a parody of "My Favorite Things" from the Rodgers and Hammerstein musical The Sound of Music (Cultural Things also echoes "Portobello Road" from another musical, Bedknobs and Broomsticks). There are several more references to The Sound of Music throughout the episode. In a sequence, Lisa takes the kids to an art film screening showing  Luis Buñuel's Un Chien Andalou. The brief two- second sequence in The Simpsons shows the famous opening scene of the French movie, in which Simone Mareuil's eye is being opened by Buñuel. 
 The scene where Dr. Swanson goes to see a therapist is a reference to the TV show The Sopranos, where Dr. Melfi, a therapist herself, is treated by Dr. Elliot Kupferberg. Actor Peter Bogdanovich, who plays Dr. Kupferberg in The Sopranos, is the voice of Dr. Swanson's psychiatrist in this episode.

Reception 
Robert Canning of IGN gave the episode a 6.2/10, stating, “This episode of The Simpsons seemed to have a lot going for it. It had many of the ingredients -- lots of guest stars, a storyline loosely based on an existing musical -- that would normally make for a memorable outing, but when it was all over, the whole thing fell short of producing a stellar half-hour. Still, as is often the case with The Simpsons, there were plenty of great laughs, even if the episode as a whole was a bit choppy.”

References

External links

 

The Simpsons (season 18) episodes
Musical television episodes
2007 American television episodes
Television episodes about murder